Por Amor (Grandes Éxitos Vol. 2 on cover) is a greatest hits/compilation album released on May 27, 2003, by Guatemalan singer-songwriter Ricardo Arjona.

Track listing

Personnel

Ricardo Arjona – composer
Elio Barbeito – producer
Diego Burgos – mastering

External links
 http://www.ricardoarjona.com/

2003 compilation albums
Ricardo Arjona compilation albums
Spanish-language compilation albums